Pachnistis silens is a moth in the family Autostichidae. It was described by Edward Meyrick in 1935. It is found in Taiwan.

References

Moths described in 1935
Pachnistis
Taxa named by Edward Meyrick